The 2023 season will be the Pittsburgh Maulers' upcoming 2nd season in the United States Football League and their 1st under head coach/general manager tandem of Ray Horton and Lonnie Young.

Draft

Personnel

Roster

Staff

Schedule

Regular Season

Standings

References

Pittsburgh
Pittsburgh Maulers
Pittsburgh Maulers (2022)